Tom Iveson (born 9 March 1983 in Nottingham) is a British short-track speed-skater.

Iveson competed at the 2010 Winter Olympics for Great Britain. In the 1000 metres, he placed fourth in his round one heat, failing to advance. He was also a member of the British relay team. He raced in the semifinal, placing 4th, advancing the British to the B Final, which the team won to finish 6th overall.

As of 2013, Iveson's best performance at the World Championships came in 2008, when he won a bronze medal as part of the British relay team. His best individual finish came in 2003, a 12th-place finish in the 500 meters. He also won silver medals as a member of the British relay team at the 2003 and 2008 European Championships.

As of 2013, Iveson has two ISU Short Track Speed Skating World Cup podium finishes, both as part of the British relay team. He has won bronze medals in 2007–08 at Salt Lake City and in 2008-09 at Vancouver. His top World Cup ranking is 10th, in the 500 metres in 2002–03.

World Cup Podiums

References 

1983 births
Living people
British male short track speed skaters
Olympic short track speed skaters of Great Britain
Short track speed skaters at the 2010 Winter Olympics
Sportspeople from Nottingham